The Thordarson Estate Historic District is located on Rock Island State Park on Rock Island in the town of Washington, Wisconsin.

History
The district is made up of the estate of Icelandic inventor Chester Thordarson. A number of the buildings were designed by Frederick Dinkelberg. The district was listed on the National Register of Historic Places in 1985 and on the State Register of Historic Places in 1989.

Thordarson's noted water tower is located within the district.

References

Historic districts on the National Register of Historic Places in Wisconsin
National Register of Historic Places in Door County, Wisconsin